is a 2013 Japanese tokusatsu superhero film directed by Toya Sato based on the classic 1970s anime television series Science Ninja Team Gatchaman.

Plot
By the year 2050 AD, a mysterious organization called Galactor has occupied half of the Earth and threatens to exterminate the human race. Around the same time, the International Science Organization had uncovered mysterious stones that bear unusual powers. It is said that one person out of approximately eight million is able to harness the power of the stones; they are known as a "Receptor". Dr. Kozaburo Nambu gathers a team of these five lucky Receptors together. Known as the "Gatchaman" team, it is their mission to defeat Galactor.

Cast
 Tori Matsuzaka as Ken Washio
 Gō Ayano as Joe Asakura
 Ayame Goriki as Jun Ohtsuki
 Tatsuomi Hamada as Jinpei Ohtsuki
 Ryohei Suzuki as Ryu Nakanishi
 Gorō Kishitani as Dr. Nambu
 Ken Mitsuishi as Dr. Kirkland
 Eriko Hatsune as Naomi
 Shidō Nakamura as Iriya

Production and release

The theme song for the movie is "Niji wo Matsu Hito", performed by popular Japanese rock band Bump of Chicken.

Reception

The movie is praised for its hero costumes and fight scenes. The film got a 5.1 ranking in IMDB. In Japan, it opened in fifth place with ¥119,201,780 (approx. US$1,171,977) and had earned ¥401,196,315 (approx. US$3,944,512) by its third weekend.

References

External links
  

2013 films
2010s Japanese superhero films
Apocalyptic films
Nippon TV films
Films set in 2015
Films set in the 2020s
Films set in Europe
Films set in Tokyo
Gatchaman
Japanese science fiction films
2010s Japanese-language films
Live-action films based on animated series
Nikkatsu films
Tokusatsu films
Tatsunoko Production
2010s English-language films
2010s Japanese films